The 2011 Cloverdale Cash Spiel was an annual curling bonspiel that was held from September 15 to 18 at the Cloverdale Curling Club in Surrey, British Columbia as part of the 2011–12 World Curling Tour. The purse for the men's and women's events was CAD$8,050 for both events.

Men

Teams

Round Robin Standings

Playoffs

Women

Teams

Round Robin Standings

Playoffs

External links

Cloverdale Cash Spiel
Cloverdale Cash Spiel
Cloverdale Cash Spiel
Cloverdale Cash Spiel
Sport in Surrey, British Columbia
Curling in British Columbia